Bemegride (trademarked as Megimide) is a central nervous system stimulant. The drug was first made in 1911. It has been used in hypnotic overdose.

As with other chemoreceptor agonists, it is a potent emetic at doses above those normally used in management of barbiturate overdose although emesis and aspiration are a concern during treatment.

It is a controlled substance in some countries.

Animal use
Bemegride is also used to induce convulsions in experimental animals.

Synthesis

The original synthesis involves first the condensation of methylethylketone with two equivalents of cyanoacetamide. The product can be rationalized by assuming first aldol condensation of ketone and active methylene compound followed by dehydration to give 3. Conjugate addition of a second molecule of cyanoacetamide would afford 4. Addition of one of the amide amines to the nitrile would then afford the iminonitrile 5. The observed product 6 can be rationalized by assuming loss of the carboxamide under strongly basic conditions. Decarboxylative hydrolysis of 6 then leads to bemegride 7.

John Bodkin Adams case 

Bemegride was the drug which suspected serial killer Dr John Bodkin Adams who failed to prescribe correctly to his patient Gertrude Hullett. Hullett took an overdose of barbiturates on 19 July 1956 but Adams only gave her a single 10cc dose of bemegride three days later on the 22nd, despite having acquired 100cc for her treatment. Hullett died the next day on 23 July 1956. Adams was charged but never tried for her murder.

References 

Antidotes
Stimulants
Respiratory agents
Convulsants
Glutarimides
GABAA receptor negative allosteric modulators